Nil Kyaw Yin (born 6 June 1925) was a Burmese weightlifter. He competed in the men's lightweight event at the 1952 Summer Olympics.

References

External links
 

1925 births
Possibly living people
Burmese male weightlifters
Olympic weightlifters of Myanmar
Weightlifters at the 1952 Summer Olympics
Place of birth missing